Strøm is a surname of Norwegian and Danish origin which may refer to:

Notable People 
Hans Strøm (1726–1797), prominent Norwegian zoologist
Halfdan Strøm (1863–1949), Norwegian painter
Gunvald Strøm-Walseng (1889–1951), Norwegian barrister
Kaare Strøm (limnologist) (1902–1967), Norwegian limnologist
Kirsti Strøm Bull (born 1945), Norwegian professor of law
Kaare Strøm (political scientist) (born 1953), Norwegian political scientist at University of California, San Diego
Tarjei Strøm (born 1978), Norwegian musician

Athletes 
Einar Strøm (gymnast) (1885–1964), Norwegian gymnast
Kristian Strøm (1892–1980), Norwegian speedskater
Harald Strøm (1897–1977), Norwegian speed skater
Roger Strøm (born 1966), Norwegian speed skater
Stefan Strøm (born 1977), Swedish flyweight boxer
Bjørn Strøm (born 1982), Norwegian football striker
Mikael Strøm (born 1959), Danish former handball player

Politicians 
Hilmar Martinus Strøm (born 1817) Norwegian politician
Sivert Christensen Strøm (1819–1902), Norwegian jurist and politician
Arne Torolf Strøm (1901–1972), Norwegian politician for the Labour Party
Bjarne Aagard Strøm (born 1920), Norwegian politician for the Liberal Party
Einar Strøm (politician) (born 1945), Norwegian politician for the Centre Party
Anne-Grete Strøm-Erichsen (born 1949), Norwegian politician for the Labour Party
Tor-Arne Strøm (born 1952), Norwegian politician for the Labour Party

See also
Steen & Strøm, Scandinavian company that owns and operates 52 shopping centres in Norway, Sweden and Denmark
Ström (surname)

Danish-language surnames
Norwegian-language surnames